The O. J. Simpson Story is a 1995 American drama film directed by Jerrold Freedman and written by Stephen Harrigan. It stars Bobby Hosea, Jessica Tuck, David Roberson, James Handy, Kimberly Russell and Harvey Jason. It premiered on Fox on January 31, 1995.

Plot
O.J. Simpson's ex-wife Nicole Brown is found murdered along with younger man Ron Goldman, outside Nicole's Brentwood townhouse. Simpson is brought to the police station as a suspect. Over the course of the film, numerous flashbacks dramatize various events in Simpson's life, from his first meeting with Nicole in 1977, to growing up in San Francisco in the 1960s, to O.J. and Nicole's romance and marriage in 1985. The pair gradually descend into domestic squabbles over Simpson's selfish and controlling behavior, with Nicole suffering depression and drug use.

Following the murders (which are never shown on-camera), Simpson panics and flees with a friend, filmed by media as the infamous 'Bronco chase' and resulting in Simpson's arrest as a suspect.

Cast

See also
The People v. O.J. Simpson: American Crime Story
O.J.: Made in America

References

External links
 
 The movie on Internet Archive and YouTube
 Promo trailer

1995 television films
1995 films
American drama films
1995 drama films
Films scored by Harald Kloser
Fox network original films
O. J. Simpson murder case
Films set in 1994
Films set in the 1960s
Films set in 1977
Films set in 1985
Films set in the 1970s
Films set in the 1980s
American football films
American films based on actual events
Crime films based on actual events
Films directed by Jerrold Freedman
1990s English-language films
1990s American films